Podlodów may refer to the following places:
Podlodów, Ryki County in Lublin Voivodeship (east Poland)
Podlodów, Gmina Łaszczów in Lublin Voivodeship (east Poland)
Podlodów, Gmina Ulhówek in Lublin Voivodeship (east Poland)